Irina Maria Bara (born 18 March 1995) is a professional tennis player from Romania.

She has a career-high singles ranking of world No. 104, achieved on 18 April 2022. On 13 May 2019, she peaked at No. 56 in the WTA doubles rankings. She won her maiden WTA Tour doubles title at the 2021 Transylvania Open, partnering Ekaterine Gorgodze. Bara has also won five doubles titles on the WTA Challenger Tour, where she is undefeated in finals, with nine singles and 29 doubles titles on the ITF Circuit, most of them on clay. 

In singles, she reached a $100k and an $80k finals, three finals at $60k events, but lost all of them, having $25k as her highest category that she won. In doubles, she won a couple of $60k and $80k tournaments, but also won one $100k event, the 2016 Soho Square Tournament in Sharm El Sheik, Egypt.

Bara is better known for her performances in doubles, reaching the top 100. Her most significant result so far is a quarterfinal at the 2018 French Open, partnering with Mihaela Buzărnescu. In 2019, she also reached quarterfinals of the Madrid Open, again with Buzărnescu. In singles, her best result so far is a third round of the 2020 French Open on her Grand Slam singles debut, also her first Major singles win. The highest round she reached in singles is the quarterfinals, at the 2019 Baltic Open, while in doubles, she reached a couple of semifinals, but never a final. She made her WTA Tour main-draw debut at the 2015 Bucharest Open in the doubles event, partnering Buzărnescu, while her first match in a singles event was two years later, at the same tournament, when she, as a wildcard player, lost in the first round to Aliaksandra Sasnovich.

Career review

2017–19: WTA Tour debut, first quarterfinal & top 200

Bara made her WTA Tour debut in singles at the 2017 Bucharest Open, when she lost as a wildcard player in the first round to Aliaksandra Sasnovich.

Her next WTA tournament was also there, in 2018; she realized her first WTA Tour singles match-win, defeating Viktoriya Tomova in the first round, and then lost to Polona Hercog. At the 2018 Moscow River Cup, she defeated Ekaterina Alexandrova before she was eliminated by Anastasija Sevastova in the second round.

In 2019, at the Baltic Open in Jūrmala, she reached her first and so far only quarterfinal, where she beat two Russian players, Margarita Gasparyan and Valentina Ivakhnenko, in the first two rounds, before losing to Sevastova. Her other WTA Tour performances that year were unsuccessful, losing in the first round in Acapulco to Beatriz Haddad Maia, in Bogotá to Sara Errani, in İstanbul to fellow Romanian Sorana Cîrstea, in Rabat to Hercog, and finally in Bucharest to Jaimee Fourlis.

On 17 July 2017, Bara entered top 200 for the first time, getting to No. 199. On 2 July 2018, she entered the top 150, reaching No. 150. On 13 August 2018, she rose to No. 139, her highest singles ranking until 2020. Until 2020, Bara was unsuccessful in her attempt to reach a main-draw at any Grand Slam tournament. She failed in qualifying at all four events, in both 2018 and 2019, as well as at Wimbledon and the US Open in 2017.

2020: Grand Slam debut & third round at the French Open
In March, Bara entered the main draw of the Lyon Open, passing through qualifying. In the main draw, she beat Tímea Babos, and then lost to Daria Kasatkina in the second round. In late September, Bara played the qualifying for the French Open, where she qualified for the first time for the main draw of a Grand Slam tournament. The other significant thing there, was that she also recorded her first win, defeating 26th seed Donna Vekić in straight sets. She won in the second round, after the retirement of Alison Van Uytvanck. In the third round against No. 3 seed Sofia Kenin, she could win only two games. Two weeks later, Bara reached a new career-high singles ranking, as world No. 115.

2021: First WTA doubles & three more Challenger titles
In May, Bara played her first $100k final in Bonita Springs which she lost to Katie Volynets. She played in the main draw at the French Open, but lost to Astra Sharma. As a result, on 28 June, she reached a new career-high singles ranking of world No. 112.
In September, Irina won her first out of three WTA Challenger titles in the season, partnering with Ekaterine Gorgodze.
In October, Bara won her first WTA Tour title, playing again with Gorgodze at the Transylvania Open in her home country.

2022: Australian Open and Wimbledon debuts, career-high singles ranking
On 18 April 2022, she reached a new career-high ranking of No. 104.

Performance timelines

Only main-draw results in WTA Tour, Grand Slam tournaments, Fed Cup/Billie Jean King Cup and Olympic Games are included in win/loss records.

Singles
Current after the 2023 Australian Open.

Doubles
Current through the 2022 Qatar Open.

WTA career finals

Doubles: 1 (1 title)

WTA Challenger finals

Doubles: 5 (5 titles)

ITF Circuit finals

Singles: 21 (9 titles, 12 runner–ups)

Doubles: 47 (29 titles, 18 runner–ups)

Notes

References

External links

 
 
 

Romanian female tennis players
1995 births
Living people
People from Ștei